Wilfred Daniel Howell was a professional football player who spent 1 season in the National Football League  with the Boston Bulldogs in 1929.

Notes

1905 births
Boston Bulldogs (NFL) players
Catholic University of America alumni
1981 deaths
Canadian players of American football